The Commander Operations (COMOPS) is a senior Royal Navy officer based at Northwood Headquarters who exercises operational command of all national maritime operations on behalf of the Fleet Commander. The post was established in 1993. 

Commander Operations previously held the additional posts of Commander Task Force (CTF) 311 (UK attack submarines) and CTF 345 (UK nuclear missile submarines). In 2015, Rear Admiral John Weale was appointed Rear Admiral Submarines/Assistant Chief of Naval Staff Submarines, while Rear Admiral Robert Tarrant was made Commander Operations (Royal Navy), separating the two posts.

Post-holders
Post-holders have included:
1993-1996 Rear-Admiral Roger Lane-Nott
1996-1998 Rear-Admiral James Perowne
1998-2002 Rear-Admiral Robert Stevens
2002-2004 Rear-Admiral Niall Kilgour
2004-2006 Rear-Admiral Paul Lambert
2006-2009 Rear-Admiral David Cooke
2009-2011 Rear-Admiral Mark Anderson
2011-2013 Rear-Admiral Ian Corder
2013-2015 Rear-Admiral Matt Parr
2015-2017 Rear-Admiral Robert Tarrant
2017-2019 Rear-Admiral Paul Halton
2019-2022 Rear-Admiral Simon Asquith
2022-present Rear-Admiral Edward Ahlgren

Subordinate formations 2016-2017
Included:
 3 Commando Brigade
 Surface Flotilla, Commodore Craig Wood, Commander, Surface Flotilla, in post April 2020
 Submarine Flotilla

References

 

O